Pelonium is a genus of checkered beetles in the family Cleridae. There are about 19 described species in Pelonium.

Species
These 19 species belong to the genus Pelonium:

 Pelonium aliciae Barr, 2005
 Pelonium bruchi Schenkling, 1908
 Pelonium carinatum Schenkling, 1908
 Pelonium crinita (Klug, 1842)
 Pelonium disconotatum Pic, 1940
 Pelonium fasciatum (LeConte, 1852)
 Pelonium formosanum Schenkling, 1912
 Pelonium granulosum Wolcott, 1909
 Pelonium guyanensis Chevrolat, 1876
 Pelonium jocosum Schenkling, 1908
 Pelonium leucophaeum (Klug, 1842)
 Pelonium luctuosum Spinola, 1844
 Pelonium maculicolle Schaeffer, 1904
 Pelonium maculiocolle Schaeffer
 Pelonium nigroaeneum Gorham, 1893
 Pelonium nigrosignatum Pic, 1940
 Pelonium peninsulare
 Pelonium scapulare Barr, 2005
 Pelonium tetrasemus (Blackwelder, 1945)

References

Further reading

External links

 

Cleridae
Articles created by Qbugbot